Albert Budachievich Kuvezin (Russian: Альберт Будачиевич Кувезин / Tuvan: Күвезин Альберт Будачи оглу, Küvezin Albert Budachi oglu, alternatively spelled Kögeezin (Көгээзин), born 27 November 1965 in Kyzyl) is a Tuvan guitarist and throat singer.

Kuvezin was one of the founding members of the Tuvan folk ensemble Huun-Huur-Tu, and is the leader of the Tuvan folk/rock/electro/post punk band Yat-Kha. He is known for his unique, contra-bass style of Tuvan kargyraa throat singing, which he calls "kanzat kargyraa."

In addition to his work with Yat-Kha, Kuvezin has contributed to albums by Alisa ("Duren", 1997), Blabbermouth, Susheela Raman, Untouchables, and Värttinä. In August, 2020 Uran Bator's track 'Uran Orda' featuring Kuvezin has been released.

References

1965 births
Living people
People from Kyzyl
20th-century Russian male singers
20th-century Russian singers
Throat singing
Tuvan musicians
Russian folk musicians
21st-century Russian male singers
21st-century Russian singers